Balagarh Assembly constituency is an assembly constituency in Hooghly district in the Indian state of West Bengal. It is reserved for scheduled castes.

Overview
As per orders of the Delimitation Commission, No. 191 Balagarh Assembly constituency (SC) is composed of the following: Balagarh community development block and Chandrahati I, Chandrahati II, Digsui and Mogra I gram panchayats of Chinsurah Mogra community development block.

Balagarh Assembly constituency is part of No. 28 Hooghly (Lok Sabha constituency). It was earlier part of Katwa (Lok Sabha constituency).

Members of Legislative Assembly

Election results

2021

2011

 
 
 

.# Swing calculated on Congress+Trinamool Congress vote percentages taken together in 2007 by-election.

1977–2007
The Balagarh seat fell vacant because of the death of the sitting MLA, Dibakanta Routh. In 2007 by-elections, Bhuban Pramanick of CPI(M) polled 60,101 votes to win the seat. Ashim Majhi of Trinamool Congress secured 51,691 votes, Bangshi Raut of the BJP secured 8,833 votes, Biswanath Malik of Congress secured 5,864 votes and Gautam Mandal of the CPI(ML) secured 4,530 votes.

Contests in most years were multi cornered but only winners and runners are being mentioned. Dibakanta Routh of CPI (M) won the Balagarh (SC) assembly seat in 2006, 2001 and 1996, defeating his nearest rivals, Asim Patra of Trinamool Congress, Lakshmi Parui of Trinamool Congress and Biswanath Malik of Congress, in the respective years. Abinash Pramanik of CPI (M) won the seat in 1991, 1987, 1982 and 1977 defeating his nearest rivals Biswanath Malik, Gopal Krishna Dhar, Nilmoni Mandal and Gauranga Halder, all of Congress, in the respective years.

1951–1972
Biren Sarkar of Congress won in 1972. Abinash Pramanik of CPI(M) won in 1971 and 1969. H.K.Das of Congress won in 1967. Brindaban Chattopdhyay of Congress won in 1962. Bejoy Krishna Modak of CPI won in 1957. In independent India's first election in 1951 the Balagarh seat was won by Brindaban Chattopdhyay of Congress.

References

Assembly constituencies of West Bengal
Politics of Hooghly district